I and Thou is a progressive rock group that is primarily a solo effort from Jason Hart (keyboardist for Renaissance, and Camel) with supporting musicians John Galgano (bassist for IZZ), Matt Johnson (drummer for Jeff Buckley and Rufus Wainwright), and Jack Petruzzelli (guitarist for Patti Smith and The Fab Faux).  Hart stated in an interview that the name was chosen to pay homage to the Martin Buber book I and Thou.

Discography
As of June 2014, I and Thou have released one album, and they are currently working on a follow-up recording.

Speak

I and Thou's first album Speak was released in 2012 and features a cover image by Renaissance lead vocalist Annie Haslam.  Hart has stated that he began developing material for the album in 2005, and recording began in 2009. Rob Hughes writing for PROG magazine observed "The ravishing minimalism of Speak is reliant on mood and atmosphere for much of its effect, with Hart combining elements of symphonic rock, prog, classical and ambient music. It's a record of discreet pleasures, slowly unlocking its secrets with every play."

The album has received generally positive reviews, receiving a 4/5 rating from Henri Strik at Background Magazine, 12/15 from Jochen König at Musikreview.de, and 9/10 from Grande Rock.

Track listing
All songs written by Jason Hart except as indicated.
"Speak" – 12:23
"...and I Awaken" - 11:35
"Hide and Seek" - 16:34
"The Face Behind the Eyes" - 13:38
"Go or Go Ahead" (Rufus Wainwright) - 6:43

Personnel
Jason Hart - piano, keyboard, lead and background vocals, percussion, glockenspiel, trumpet, additional guitar and sound effects
John Galgano - bass guitar and background vocals
Matt Johnson - drums
Jack Petruzzelli - electric, acoustic, and classical guitar, mandolin, banjo

Additional personnel
Paul Bremner - additional guitar
Maxim Moston - violin
Laura Meade - background vocals
Keren Ann - vocals on "Hide and Seek"
Steve Hogarth - vocals on "Go or Go Ahead"

Production
Jason Hart - producer
Jack Petruzzelli, Philip Hart and Mac Simpson - executive producers
Mixed by Fernando Lodeiro
Mastered by Fred Kevorkian
Cover image, "This Glorious Earth", by Annie Haslam

References

British progressive rock groups
Musical groups established in 2012
2012 establishments in the United Kingdom